Tidewater Community College (TCC) is a public community college in South Hampton Roads, Virginia, with campuses in Chesapeake, Norfolk, Portsmouth, Suffolk, and Virginia Beach. It is part of the Virginia Community College System and is accredited by the Southern Association of Colleges and Schools Commission on Colleges to award the associate degree.

History
The school was founded in 1968, when a local philanthropist, Fred W. Beazley, closed the existing Frederick College and deeded the land to the Commonwealth of Virginia for the creation of Tidewater Community College. With the support of Hampton Roads' municipalities, TCC quickly expanded to Virginia Beach and Chesapeake, and in the 1990s, it helped revitalize downtown Norfolk by establishing a campus in former department store buildings. In 2010, the Portsmouth campus relocated to a new site within the city.

In 2003 TCC signed an agreement with Norfolk State University that allows students to transfer from one to another.

In 2017, Tidewater Community College (Virginia Beach and Norfolk campuses) entered into an agreement with Virginia Wesleyan University on the "Tidewater Promise," a parallel concurrent enrollment program that permits students to take advantage of most services and resources on the VWU campus while enrolled as associate degree students at TCC. The program enables students to guarantee tuition costs for four years and to complete a four-year bachelor's degree less expensively than attending a state university.

Edna V. Baehre-Kolovani took office as the college's fifth president in July 2012. She succeeded Deborah M. DiCroce, who had served for 14 years.  In early 2018, the college's faculty voted "no confidence" in Baehre-Kolovani as enrollments declined and the college announced another round of layoffs (following layoffs in 2017).

Tidewater Community College's mascot is Storm and the school colors are royal blue and white.

Facilities
Tidewater Community College has four campuses:
Fred W. Beazley Portsmouth Campus, which opened in 2010 and has four buildings
 A Building
 B Building
 C Building 
 Student Center
Norfolk Campus, which opened in 1997 and has five buildings
Andrews Building 
Martin Building
Walker Building 
Roper Performing Arts Center
Student Center 
Chesapeake Campus, which opened in 1973
George B. Pass Building
Marian P. Whitehurst Technology Center
Academic Building 
Student Center (opened Spring 2014)
Virginia Beach Campus, which opened in 1973 and has 11 buildings including
The Advanced Technology Center (ATC) in partnership with the City of Virginia Beach and Virginia Beach City Public Schools
Joint-Use Library in partnership with City of Virginia Beach  
Student Center
Bayside Building
Tidewater Community College also has several centers:
Center for Workforce Solutions, on the site of the original Frederick campus in North Suffolk
The Jeanne & George Roper Performing Arts Center, located in downtown Norfolk
The Center for Military & Veterans Education, including a Virginia Employment Commission (VEC) office, located on the Virginia Beach campus
Regional Health Professions Center, located on the Virginia Beach campus
Visual Arts Center, located in downtown Portsmouth
Regional Automotive Center, located in Chesapeake
In addition, the Joseph N. Green Jr. District Administration Building houses TCC's administrative offices in downtown Norfolk. Classes are also offered at the Old Dominion University Tri-Cities Center.

Literary festival and journal
Tidewater Community College publishes an annual literary journal called the Channel Marker. Submissions are accepted in the fall semester and the publication is released in the spring (usually April) in conjunction with TCC's Annual Literary Festival.

Notable alumni
Roy Cooper (West Virginia politician)
John Cosgrove (Virginia politician)
Jay Pharaoh
Chris Richardson
Winsome Sears
Terrie Suit

References

External links

Two-year colleges in the United States
Virginia Community College System
Education in Norfolk, Virginia
Educational institutions established in 1968
Education in Portsmouth, Virginia
Education in Chesapeake, Virginia
Education in Virginia Beach, Virginia
1968 establishments in Virginia
Education in Suffolk, Virginia